Hugh II (920–before 992), Count of Maine, son of Hugh I, Count of Maine, and an unknown mother, probably a daughter of Gauzlin II, Count of Maine.  He was, like his father, a vassal of his uncle Hugh the Great.

After the death of Hugh the Great, Hugh II allied himself Fulk II the Good, Count of Anjou, and Theobald the Trickster, Count of Blois.  Hugh later joined Theobald’s son Odo against Seinfroy, Bishop of Le Mans.  Hugh and Odo had to flee and seek refuge with Bouchard I, Count of Vendôme, in the areas that form the Bas-Vendômois.

In 939 he fought alongside Alan II, Duke of Brittany and Judicael Berengar against the Vikings at the Battle of Trans-la-Forêt.
Hugh had by his unknown wife: Hugh III, Count of Maine, Fulk of Maine, (d. after 992) and Herbert “Baco” of Maine (d. after 1046), regent of Hugh IV, Count of Maine. Hugh was succeeded as Count of Maine by his son Hugh III.

References

Sources 
Riché, Pierre, The Carolingians; A Family who Forged Europe, Trans. Michael Idomir Allen, University of Pennsylvania Press, Philadelphia, 1993
K.S.B. Keats-Rohan, Two Studies in North French Prosopography, Journal of Medieval History, Vol. 20 (1994), p. 10

Counts of Maine